Jonathan Copete Valencia (born 23 January 1988) is a Colombian footballer who plays for Brazilian club Bahia, on loan from Avaí. Mainly a left winger, he can also play as a forward.

Club career

Early career
Born in Cali, Valle del Cauca, Copete started his professional career in 2005 in Venezuela, playing for Trujillanos. In 2007, he joined Atlético Trujillo in the second tier, scoring 16 goals in the club's promotion campaign.

After one year back at Trujillanos, Copete joined another Venezuelan team, Zamora, where he won the 2011 Clausura, but lost to Deportivo Táchira the season's final. The Colombian forward was also the top goalscorer of the 2011 Clausura.

Santa Fe
In 2011, Copete joined Independiente Santa Fe, his first team in his home country of Colombia. There, he was a key player in his team's victory at the 2012 Apertura, scoring seven goals, including the championship goal in the second leg of the final against Deportivo Pasto.

Vélez
After his championship winning season at Santa Fe, Copete joined Vélez Sársfield of the Argentine Primera División, which purchased 50% of his rights for a fee of US$3 million. Despite suffering an injury early on, his first season proved successful, as he helped Vélez to obtain the 2012 Inicial.

In January 2014, it was announced that Copete would rejoin Santa Fe after two years playing in Argentina, on loan until June.

Atlético Nacional
On 9 July, Copete moved to league rivals Atlético Nacional. He scored 11 goals for the club during the 2015 campaign, as his side achieved the Finalización title.

Santos

After impressing in 2016 Copa Libertadores, Copete signed for Brazilian Série A club Santos on 23 May 2016, for a fee of US$1.5 million. He signed a four-year deal on 23 June, after the international transfer window opened.

Copete made his debut for the club on 29 June 2016, coming on as a half-time substitute for Vitor Bueno and scoring his team's first in a 2–3 away loss against Grêmio; four days later, again coming from the bench, he provided two assists and scored once in a 3–0 home win against Chapecoense. In October, he scored the winning goals in derbies against São Paulo and Palmeiras, taking his tally up to seven in the league.

In November 2016, Copete scored three goals in only two games, netting the winner in a 2–1 success at Ponte Preta and a brace in a 3–2 home win over Vitória, becoming the club's top goalscorer in the Brasileirão alongside Vítor Bueno. In March of the following year, his deal was extended for a further season.

On 9 July 2017, Copete scored a hat-trick in a 3–2 win against São Paulo. Late in the month, after scoring a double against Flamengo, he became the foreigner who scored more goals for Santos with 22, surpassing Juan Raul Echevarrieta.

Pachuca (loan)
On 8 June 2019, after featuring rarely due to the competition's foreign player limitations, Copete joined Liga MX side Pachuca on loan for one year.

Everton Viña del Mar (loan)
On 7 February 2020, Copete joined Everton de Viña del Mar on loan for the season, after terminating his previous deal with Pachuca.

2021 season
Copete returned to Santos in July 2020, but due to the club's transfer ban, he was only registered for the 2021 campaign. On 10 June 2021, as his contract was due to expire, he left the club.

Avaí
On 23 June 2021, Copete was announced at Série B side Avaí. An undisputed starter in the club's top tier promotion, he renewed his contract until 2023 on 21 February 2022.

Bahia (loan)
On 6 July 2022, after losing his starting spot, Copete was loaned to Bahia in the second tier until the end of 2023.

International career
On 4 November 2016, Copete was called up to Colombia national team by manager José Pékerman for two 2018 FIFA World Cup qualification matches against Chile and Argentina. He made his full international debut eleven days later, replacing Daniel Torres in a 0–3 loss against the latter.

Career statistics

Club

International

Honours

Club
Atlético Trujillo
Venezuelan Segunda División: 2008–09

Independiente Santa Fe
Categoría Primera A: 2012-I

Vélez Sarsfield
Argentine Primera División: 2012 Inicial

Atlético Nacional
Categoría Primera A: 2015-F

References

External links

1988 births
Living people
Footballers from Cali
Colombian footballers
Association football wingers
Association football forwards
Club Almagro players
Venezuelan Primera División players
Trujillanos FC players
Zamora FC players
Categoría Primera A players
Independiente Santa Fe footballers
Atlético Nacional footballers
Argentine Primera División players
Club Atlético Vélez Sarsfield footballers
Campeonato Brasileiro Série A players
Campeonato Brasileiro Série B players
Santos FC players
Liga MX players
C.F. Pachuca players
Chilean Primera División players
Everton de Viña del Mar footballers
Avaí FC players
Esporte Clube Bahia players
Colombia international footballers
Colombian expatriate footballers
Colombian expatriate sportspeople in Argentina
Colombian expatriate sportspeople in Venezuela
Colombian expatriate sportspeople in Brazil
Colombian expatriate sportspeople in Mexico
Colombian expatriate sportspeople in Chile
Expatriate footballers in Argentina
Expatriate footballers in Venezuela
Expatriate footballers in Brazil
Expatriate footballers in Mexico
Expatriate footballers in Chile